Johnnie Lee Vivens (May 22, 1896 – February 2, 1958) was an American Negro league pitcher in the 1920s.

A native of Fayette, Missouri, Vivens played for the St. Louis Stars in 1929. He died in Columbia, Missouri in 1958 at age 61.

References

External links
 and Seamheads

1896 births
1958 deaths
St. Louis Stars (baseball) players
Baseball pitchers
Baseball players from Missouri
People from Fayette, Missouri
20th-century African-American sportspeople